Counsels of Wisdom is a piece of Babylonian wisdom literature written in Akkadian containing moral exhortations. It is composed primarily of two-line units, without sections. Existing manuscripts are fragmentary, but the original was estimated to be about 160 lines.

Date of authorship 

Scholars disagree on the date of the work. Gemser and Bohl placed it in the First Dynasty, but Lambert believes it should be dated to the Kassite period. The work is attested primarily by a stone tablet written in Late Babylonian script.

Comparison with other wisdom literature 

The text is addressed to "my son", which may be a physical son, a student, a successor, or a trope of the genre, as it is in later wisdom literature. Scholars have observed several pieces of ancient wisdom literature to be similar, including the Instructions of Shuruppak, Counsels of a Pessimist, and the Hymn to Šamaš (See Shamash). Together these works were an ancient genre. Similarities have been noticed with the Book of Proverbs, but no literary dependence has been found. The Counsels of Wisdom is believed to have been somewhat popular in its time, since fragments of this passage are quoted in other extant works.

Kindness to Evildoers 

Biblical scholar John Nolland sees a passage in the Counsels of Wisdom as a possible precursor to Jesus' command to "love your enemies": "Do not return evil to the man who disputes with you; requite with kindness your evil-doer... smile on your adversary."

See also 
 Akkadian literature
 Wisdom literature

Notes

References

External links 
II.3 Counsels of Wisdom Critical edition and translation of the text (electronic Babylonian Library).

Akkadian literature
Ancient Near East wisdom literature
First Babylonian Empire
Kassites